Frederick Gilman Spencer III (December 8, 1925 – June 24, 2011) was an American newspaper editor.

He was editor at The Trentonian, Philadelphia Daily News from 1975 to 1984, New York Daily News from 1984 to 1989, and The Denver Post, from 1989 to 1993.  "As an editor, Spencer gained a reputation for pulling struggling newspapers back from the brink and inspiring respect and loyalty among his staff. He guided the Philadelphia Daily News for nine years and then in 1984 moved to the New York Daily News, where he reveled in the tabloid wars."

Gil Spencer lived in Manhattan with his wife, Isabel, until his death in 2011, aged 85.

Awards
 1974 Pulitzer Prize for Editorial Writing
 2003 George Polk Award

References

1925 births
2011 deaths
Writers from Philadelphia
American newspaper editors
Pulitzer Prize for Editorial Writing winners
George Polk Award recipients
People from Manhattan
The Denver Post people
Journalists from New York City
Journalists from Pennsylvania